Louis Richard Brunton (29 December 1891 – 23 March 1934) was a New Zealand cricketer. A wicket-keeper and useful lower-order batsman, he played in fifteen first-class matches for Canterbury from 1913 to 1926.

Brunton served overseas as a medical orderly with the New Zealand Expeditionary Force in World War I. He worked for the Para Rubber Company in Christchurch. He died at home in the Christchurch suburb of St Albans in March 1934 after being ill for some weeks. He was survived by his wife, Jessie.

See also
 List of Canterbury representative cricketers

References

External links
 

1891 births
1934 deaths
New Zealand cricketers
Canterbury cricketers
Cricketers from Christchurch
New Zealand military personnel of World War I